The Institute of Business Administration of the University of Dhaka, commonly known as IBA, is a business school in Dhaka, Bangladesh.

History
IBA was founded in 1966 in collaboration with Indiana University, Bloomington, USA, under a Ford Foundation Financial Assistance Program with the objective of providing professional training to create future business leaders. The founder-director of IBA is Professor M. Safiullah. IBA began by launching its flagship MBA program. In the 1970s, the MPhil and PhD programs were introduced. The BBA program was started in 1993 at the institute. In 2007, the Executive MBA program was launched to cater to the growing demand for quality education among mid-career executives.

Administration

Board of Governors
IBA is governed by the fourth Statute of the University of Dhaka and functions within the broad framework of policies, rules and regulations of the University.

Academic Board
The Academic Board of the Institute reviews the academic programs. All Professors and Associate Professors of IBA are members of this Board and the Director of IBA is the Chairperson of the board. The other members are the Dean of the Faculty of Business Studies and the Chairmen of the Departments thereunder. There is also a provision of including nominated members from the academic and business communities.

Co-ordination and Development (C&D) Committee
The Co-ordination and Development Committee consists of the top one-third of the total number of teachers of the institute. It is responsible for, among other things, planning of further development of the Institute in the areas of academic and research programs, and recruitment and training of teachers.

Academic Committee
The Academic Committee is composed of all the teachers of the institute. The Committee provides operational guidance to the academic programs of the institute. It deals with admission of students, curricula, examinations, teaching and co-curricular activities etc.

Academic programs
 BBA Program
 MBA Program
 PhD Program
 MPhil Program
 Executive MBA
 Doctor of Business Administration(DBA)

Management Development Programs (MDP)
The Management Development Program of the institute is geared towards helping individual managers and organizations augment their management development efforts. The services provided by the program include management trainings, seminars, workshops and executive forums.
 
The following courses are regularly been offered by MDP:
 ACBA: Advanced Certificate in Business Administration (A six months long Joint Program by IBA, DU & AMDISA, a SAARC recognized body)
 AFNA: Accounting For Non-Accountants
 CBSI: Competitive Business Strategy & Innovation
 FNM: Finance For Non-Finance Managers
 HRMC: Human Resource Management Competencies
 LCMC: Leadership Certificate in Managerial Communication
 MCFM: Marketing Competencies For Managers
 MSSP: Marketing Skills For Service Professionals
 RMC: Relationship Marketing Competencies

The MDP also provides some two-day (weekend) short courses on following topics:
 Credit Risk Management (CRM)
 Integrated Marketing Communication (IMC)
 Leadership & Change Management
 Sales & Salesmanship Excellence
 Supply Chain Management

Campus

IBA has its own premises within the campus of the University of Dhaka. The four storied main building contains  of floor space.
To cater to the unique needs of the business and society, the institute has created some special centres such as the Center for Management Research and Publications(CMRP), IBA Computer Center (IBACC), Development and Policy Research Center(DPRC), Center for Women's Studies (CWS), Center for Entrepreneurship and Small Business Development (CESBD), IBA Case Development Center (ICDC), Center for Population Management and Research (CPMR), and IBA Environment Development Center (IEDC). Each Center is headed by a Chairperson chosen from the IBA faculty members.

Accommodation 
IBA students coming from outside Dhaka can reside in hostel, situated outside campus, in Green Road of Dhaka. A warden, appointed from the faculty members of IBA, looks after the proper functioning of the student hostel. IBA Professors' Quarters is adjacent to the IBA Hostel at the same location.

Notable faculty
Muzaffar Ahmed, economist and Ekushey Padak laureate academician
Imran Rahman, academician and musician
Salimullah Khan, intellectual and academician.
Md. Tafazzul Islam, former Chief Justice of Bangladesh.
Hafiz Siddiqi, former VC of North South University.

Notable alumni 

Ahsan Adelur Rahman, politician
Muhammed Aziz Khan, founder and chairman of the Summit Group
Tahsan Rahman Khan, actor, singer, songwriter and former lecturer of BRAC University
Shahriar Alam, politician, state minister for foreign affairs, Bangladesh 
Syed Alamgir, businessman
Nazmul Hasan Papon, a member of parliament and current president of Bangladesh Cricket Board
Mahmudur Rahman, one of the owners and acting editor of Bengali daily newspapers, Amar Desh
Mohammed Shamsul Hoque Bhuyan, businessman and member of parliament.
Ayman Sadiq, Founder at 10 Minute School.

References

University of Dhaka